You Me Her is an American–Canadian comedy-drama television series that revolves around a suburban married couple who are entering a three-way romantic relationship, one non-typical type of polyamorous relationship. The series is set in Portland, Oregon and was created by John Scott Shepherd. The series is also promoted as TV's "first polyromantic comedy". On June 9, 2016, Audience Network renewed the series for a second and third season. 
On July 27, 2018, the series was renewed for a fourth and fifth season. The fourth season premiered on April 9, 2019.

On May 10, 2019, Audience Network announced that the fifth season will be the last season and Gail Harvey will be directing all the episodes for the season. However, Audience Network ended operations on May 22, 2020, prior to airing the remaining episodes. The season was released in full on Crave in Canada on June 7, 2020. Seasons 1-5 were aired on Netflix in Europe and Latin America. In 2022, all five seasons were found to be available in the United States on Freevee.

Premise
The series revolves around married, vanilla thirty-somethings Jack and Emma Trakarsky, from Portland, Oregon, whose desires to conceive have been hampered by their lack of sex drive. One day, Jack's efforts to solve the problem lead both Emma and him to Izzy Silva, a 25-year-old graduate student and part-time escort. After initially intending to see her as clients, the two jointly start to fall in love with Izzy, who in turn starts to feel the same way. Consequently, they decide to terminate the arrangement and bring Izzy into the marriage as a lover. This opens up a world of new challenges as they find themselves having to navigate their way through a minefield of prying, nosy neighbours with narrow social norms and prejudices, whilst at the same time struggling to confront their own feelings and insecurities, and adjust to the unfamiliar dynamic of a non-typical type of polyamorous relationship.

Cast

Main 
 Greg Poehler as Jack Trakarsky, a student counsellor and Emma's husband
 Rachel Blanchard as Emma Trakarsky, an architect.
 Priscilla Faia as Isabelle "Izzy" Silva, a graduate student in Psychology and call girl
 Melanie Papalia as Nina Martone (season 2–5; recurring season 1), Izzy's roommate and best friend

Recurring 
 Jennifer Spence as Carmen Amari (seasons 1–4), one of the Trakarsky's neighbors and Emma's best friend
 Ennis Esmer as Dave Amari, one of the Trakarsky's neighbors and Jack's best friend
 Jarod Joseph as Andy Cutler, Izzy's brief love interest who later becomes romantically involved with Nina
 Kevin O'Grady (season 1) and Dave Collette (seasons 2–5) as Gabe, Jack's brother and confidant
 Chelah Horsdal as Lori Matherfield (seasons 1–2), the Trakarsky's nosy neighbor and Ava's mother
 Laine MacNeil as Ava Matherfield (seasons 1–2), Lori's teenage daughter
 Jerry Wasserman as Dean Weinstock (season 1) 
 Patrick Gilmore as Shaun, a bartender and Nina's employer, and later her new love interest
 Michael Hogan as Emma's father (season 2)
 Agam Darshi as Ruby Shivani (season 2), Jack's high school girlfriend
 Lara Gilchrist as Hannah (season 3), Carmen's partner in creating a lifestyle magazine
 Carmel Amit as Kylie (season 3), Emma's new girlfriend in Seattle
 Adam Beauchesne as Will (seasons 4-5), a realtor and one of the Trakarsky's neighbors
 Marc-Anthony Massiah as Marty (season 4-5), Will's boyfriend with whom he lives, being neighbors of the Trakarskys
 Gabrielle Rose as Jack and Gabe's mother who visits to make amends with Jack
 Robert Moloney as Ben (seasons 3-5), Izzy's father, later becomes engaged and marries Lala.
 Enid-Raye Adams as Lala (seasons 4-5), hated neighbor of the Trakarskys, then becomes engaged to Ben, Izzy's father, and marries him

Episodes

Series overview

Season 1 (2016)

Season 2 (2017)

Season 3 (2018)

Season 4 (2019)

Season 5 (2020)

Broadcast
All seasons are available on Netflix exclusively outside of the United States and Canada.

Production 
Filmed in and around Vancouver, British Columbia.

Awards and nominations

References

External links
 
 

2010s American comedy-drama television series
2010s American LGBT-related comedy television series
2010s American LGBT-related drama television series
2010s American romantic comedy television series
2010s American sex comedy television series
2016 American television series debuts
2020s American comedy-drama television series
2020s American LGBT-related comedy television series
2020s American LGBT-related drama television series
2020s American romantic comedy television series
2020s American sex comedy television series
2020s romantic drama television series
Adultery in television
American romantic drama television series
Audience (TV network) original programming
Bisexuality-related television series
English-language television shows
Polyamory in fiction
Prostitution in American television
Television series about marriage
Television shows filmed in Vancouver
Television shows set in Portland, Oregon